A dandan or dendan is a mythical sea creature that appears in volume 9 of The Book of One Thousand and One Nights (or Arabian Nights). It appears in the tale "Abdullah the Fisherman and Abdullah the Merman", where the merman tells the fisherman that the dandan is the largest fish in the sea and is the enemy of the mermen. A dendan is capable of swallowing a ship and all its crew in a single gulp.

A dandan was depicted on a Magic: The Gathering card, from the game's Arabian Nights expansion set.

See also
Bahamut, another large fish in Arabian mythology

Arabian legendary creatures
One Thousand and One Nights